Carbona may refer to:
 Carbona (moth), a genus of moth
 Carbona, California, United States
 Carbonne (Occitan: Carbona), France
 Delta Carbona L.P., an American chemical company, maker of Carbona Cleaning Fluid